Fallen Haven is a 1997 computer game. It is a science-fiction themed turn-based strategy game. It functions on Windows 95 and 98 computers.

A sequel, Liberation Day, was released in 1998.

Plot
The game depicts a battle between the human race and an alien culture called the Taurans, sparked by a misunderstanding.

The armies of the Humans are relatively simple and rugged, while the armies of the Taurans are more technologically advanced.

Reception

The game received average reviews. The Charlotte Observer noted its multiple levels of difficulty. However, Next Generation said, "In the end, Fallen Haven is little more than a good idea with poor implementation. With a few gameplay tweaks and the addition of the two-player option Fallen Haven might have been great, but as it stands you're better off sticking with Civilization 2."

References

External links
 Official website
 

1997 video games
Turn-based strategy video games
Video games about extraterrestrial life
Video games developed in Canada
Windows games